The koudi (Chinese: 口笛; pinyin: kǒudí; also spelled kou di) is a very small Chinese flute made from bamboo. It is the smallest flute in Chinese Flute family. Its original shape is from prehistorical instruments made with animal bone, while Koudi is made with wood, bamboo or PVC, which is very distinct with the original shape. It was invented in 1971 by  dizi master Yu Xunfa (俞逊发, 1946–2006).

Overview
In 1971, the famous Chinese Flute player Yu Xunfa, who was inspired by original prehistorical instrument, made the first Koudi. This instrument contains one octave, and two years later this instrument went to public by playing the recomposed Romanian folk song Ciocârlia (《云雀》). After that, to expand the range, Xu made the five-hole Koudi, and Bai Chengren (白诚仁) composed Morning of A Miao Village《苗岭的早晨》(MaoLing de ZaoChen). Therefore, Koudi became famous in China.
The instrument comes in two sizes. The smaller size, called gaoyin koudi, which is only 5–6 cm in length, has only the holes on the sides, where the thumbs can control the full range of pitch by incrementally opening the holes. The larger size, referred to as zhongyin koudi, is 8–9 cm long and has an additional 2–4 holes on the front (played with the fingers, these holes give slightly more precision to pitch changes). The gaoyin koudi is pitched an octave above the xiao di, whereas the zhongyin koudi is pitched an octave above the bang di. The range of the koudi is about a ninth or tenth, and it can bend notes over the entire range of the instrument.

A related instrument in Hunnan province called the tuliang is also center-blown and open-ended but is much larger (about the size of the qudi).

One of the most famous compositions for the koudi is"MaoLing de ZaoChen" and YunQue (Romanian: Ciocârlia, lit. "The Skylark"). The instrument is also used in Chinese orchestral pieces such as Fei Tian.

Basic skills
Basically, a Koudi has two octaves, but it is not easy to get on the correct pitch.

Audio sample
MiaoLing de ZaoChen by Yu Xunfa

Notable players
Notable gaohu players include:
 Yu Xunfa (俞逊发) (1946–2006), in China
Zhan Yongming (詹永明) (1957- ),in China

See also
Dizi
Chinese flutes
Traditional Chinese musical instruments
Bamboo musical instruments

References

External links

Video
Koudi video: Ciocârlia by Zhan Yongming

Chinese musical instruments
Side-blown flutes
1971 musical instruments
Bamboo flutes